Union Sportive de Beau Bassin-Rose Hill is a Mauritian football club based in Beau Bassin-Rose Hill, Plaines Wilhems District. 

The club also includes a women's football team, men and women handball teams and a women's volleyball team.

Ground
Their home stadium is Stade Sir Gaëtan Duval (cap. 6,500) in Beau Bassin-Rose Hill, Plaines Wilhems District.

Season 2012–19
During the 2012/13 season, USBBRH won promotion to the National First Division, second tier of the Mauritian League after finishing second to La Cure Sylvester in the National Second Division. USBBRH was relegated back to the National Second Division at the end of the 2015/16 season. After narrowly missing out on promotion during the 2016/17 and 2017/18 seasons, USBBRH won The National Division Two and was promoted back to the National Division One.

Season to season

Achievements
Mauritian Cup: 1
2001

Mauritian Republic Cup: 1
2002

National Division Two: 1
2018-19

See also
 Mauritius Football Association
 List of football clubs in Mauritius

External links
 Facebook Page

References

Football clubs in Mauritius